Folly Lake is the name of two lakes and a community in Nova Scotia, Canada:

 Folly Lake (Annapolis County), in Annapolis County
 Folly Lake (Colchester County), in Colchester County
Folly Lake (community), a community on the shore of the latter lake